Yusuf Ibrahim (May 27, 1877 in Cairo, Egypt – February 3, 1953 in Jena, Germany), also known as Yusuf Bey Murad Ibrahim, was a physician and pediatrician.  He was responsible for the description of congenital cutaneous candidiasis, originally known as Beck-Ibrahim disease. The discovery of his association with the Nazi euthanasia program during the World War II resulted in an effort to rename this disease.  The clinic for child and adolescent medicine at Friedrich Schiller University in Jena also chose to change its name from Kinderklinik Jussuf Ibrahim after his Nazi past was uncovered.

Study Medicine 
In 1886 Ibrahim and his older brother Ali Ramiz went to Munich to study medicine. The presence of these two foreigners in their different colors caught the attention of German students. In 1894, the two brothers finished their studies at the LMU Munich. They continued their studies at their father's expense until they finished postgraduate studies in 1900, so Ali returned to Egypt, leaving Yusuf alone to find his way in Germany.

See also
 List of medical eponyms with Nazi associations

References

Physicians in the Nazi Party
1877 births
1953 deaths
Egyptian emigrants to Germany